Kanada ((ISO 15919/IAST: Kānaṛā rāgaṅg Hindi: कान्हड़ा, Bengali: কানাড়া)) also known as Kanhada  is a group of ragas in Hindustani classical music. The name Kanada suggests that it may have originated in the Carnatic music tradition and Kannada country.

Ragas in this group belong to different thaats, but particularly to the Asavari or Kafi thaat. Komal Gandhar (Ga) and Komal Dhaivat (Dha) are vakra (zigzag) in descent and are used in phrases like gMR and dnP.

List of ragas in the Kanada family 
The following ragas belong to this group :

Abhogi Kanada 
Adana Kanada 
Asavari Kanada 
Basanti Kanada
Bageshree Kanada
Bhavsakh Kanada
Darbari Kanada
Enayatkhani Kanada
Devsakh Kanada
Gunji Kanada
Husseini Kanada
Jayant Kanada 
Kafi Kanada
Kausi Kanada
Lachari Kanada
Lankashree Kanada
Malkauns Kanada 
Nagadhwani Kanada
Navarasa Kanada
Nayaki Kanada
Rageshree Kanada
Raisa Kanada
Ramsakh Kanada
Shahana Kanada
Sughrai Kanada
Suha Kanada

See also
 List of Film Songs based on Ragas
 Sarang ragas

References

Literature

Hindustani ragas